Acfred is a masculine given name of Germanic origin. It may refer to:

Acfred, Count of Toulouse (r. 842–43)
Acfred I of Carcassonne, count (r. 877–906)
Acfred II of Carcassonne, count (r. 908–33)
Acfred, Duke of Aquitaine (r. 926–27)

Masculine given names